WSMS (99.9 FM, "The Fox") is a Mississippi based radio station broadcasting an album-oriented rock (AOR) music format. Licensed to Artesia, Mississippi, United States, the station serves the Columbus-Starkville-West Point area. The station is currently owned by Cumulus Media and features programming from Premiere Radio Networks.

History
The Federal Communications Commission issued a construction permit for the station to Bravo Communications, Inc. on May 10, 1984. The station was assigned the call sign WZIX on July 3, 1984, and received its license to cover on July 15, 1987. On June 1, 1991, the station changed its call sign to WJWF-FM. Bravo Communications assigned the station's license to the current owner, Cumulus Media, on February 14, 2002. On April 1, 1993, the station changed its call sign again to WQNN, and on March 1, 1996, to the current WSMS.

References

External links

SMS
Radio stations established in 1987
Album-oriented rock radio stations in the United States
Cumulus Media radio stations